Cooperation and Conflict is a quarterly peer-reviewed academic journal that covers the field of international studies with a Nordic and European focus. The editors-in-chief are Annika Björkdahl and Martin Hall (Lund University). The journal was established in 1965 and is published by SAGE Publications in association with the Nordic International Studies Association.

Abstracting and indexing 
The journal is abstracted and indexed in Scopus and the Social Sciences Citation Index. According to the Journal Citation Reports, the journal has a 2015 impact factor of 1.000, ranking it =65th out of 163 journals in the category "Political Science" and 32nd out of 86 journals in the category "International Relations".

Former editors 
 Bengt Sundelius (1994-1999)
Iver B. Neumann (1999-2002)

See also 
 List of political science journals
 List of international relations journals

Further reading 
Bengt Sundelius. 1996. "Editor's Introduction: Entering the Thirty-first Year of the Nordic Journal of International Studies." Cooperation and Conflict Vol. 31, No. 1 (March 1996), pp. 5-9

References

External links 
 
 Nordic International Studies Association

International relations journals
Publications established in 1965
Quarterly journals
English-language journals
SAGE Publishing academic journals